The four teams in this group played against each other on a home-and-away basis. The winner Portugal qualified for the 1966 FIFA World Cup held in England.

Matches

 

 

 

 

 

 

 

 

 

 

 

Portugal qualified.

Final Table

Team stats

Head coach:  Manuel da Luz Afonso

Head coach:  Václav Jira (first match);  Jozef Marko (second to sixth match)

Head coach:  Ilie Oană

Head coach:  Sandro Puppo

External links
FIFA official page
RSSSF – 1966 World Cup Qualification
Allworldcup

4
1964–65 in Portuguese football
qual
1964–65 in Czechoslovak football
1965–66 in Czechoslovak football
1964–65 in Romanian football
1965–66 in Romanian football
1964–65 in Turkish football
1965–66 in Turkish football